M86 or M-86 may refer to:

 HMAS Diamantina (M 86), Huon-class minehunter in the Royal Australian Navy
 INS Malpe (M86), Indian Naval minesweeper ship
 Lenticular Galaxy M86 or Messier 86, a lenticular galaxy in the Virgo Cluster
 M86 expressway, an expressway in Hungary
 M86 machine gun, a 7.62mm general-purpose machine gun
 M86 (Johannesburg), short metropolitan route in the Greater Johannesburg, South Africa
 M-86 (Michigan highway), a state highway in Michigan
 M86 (New York City bus), a bus route in Manhattan
 M-86-Prairie River Bridge, road bridge over the Dowagiac River near Sumnerville, Michigan
 M86 Pursuit Deterrent Munition, a U.S. anti-personnel landmine
 M86 Security, privately owned Internet threat protection company
 M86 sniper rifle, a 7.62mm sniper rifle employed by the U.S. military
 M86 Swimming Center, complex of pools in southeast of Madrid, Spain
 Tumansky M-86, 14-cylinder, two-row, air-cooled radial engine
 Valmet Sniper M86, a Finnish sniper rifle
 Zastava M86, machine gun manufactured by Zastava Arms